Sinacaban, officially the Municipality of Sinacaban, is a 5th class municipality in the province of Misamis Occidental, Philippines. According to the 2020 census, it has a population of 19,671 people.

Geography

Climate

Barangays
Sinacaban is politically subdivided into 17 barangays.

Demographics

Economy

References

External links
 [ Philippine Standard Geographic Code]
Philippine Census Information
Local Governance Performance Management System

Municipalities of Misamis Occidental